Kiming'ini is a settlement in Kenya's Kakamega County.

References 

Populated places in Western Province (Kenya)
Kakamega County